Holton-le-Clay was a railway station on the East Lincolnshire Railway which served the English villages of Holton-le-Clay and Tetney in Lincolnshire between 1848 and 1964. It was originally named Holton-le-Clay and Tetney, but Tetney was dropped soon after opening, even though the station was more conveniently sited for that village. The line through Holton-le-Clay remained open for freight until December 1980, but could be reopened by the Lincolnshire Wolds Railway as its northern terminus.

History
It was constructed by contractor John Waring and Sons of Rotherham who, in December 1846, had agreed to construct the line for the sum of £46,102. The architects of the station buildings were John Grey Weightman and Matthew Ellison Hadfield of Sheffield.

The station was initially named Holton-le-Clay and Tetney to reflect its location one mile to the south of the Lincolnshire village of Holton-le-Clay and slightly closer to Tetney to the east. It consisted of staggered platforms either side of the level crossing over the Tetney road; the down platform to the north and the up to the south. A signal box constructed in the standard East Lincolnshire Railway pattern stood on the north side of the crossing. It controlled the crossing and a small goods yard situated to the south of the crossing on the down side. The yard was served by a single siding which trailed off the down line to end in cattle dock.

Although the station was more convenient for Tetney than Holton-le-Clay, Tetney was dropped from the station's name soon after opening. The July 1922 timetable saw nine up and down weekday services, plus one Sunday service each way, call at Holton-le-Clay. The station closed to passengers on 4 July 1955, with the goods yard remaining open a further nine years until 25 May 1964.

Present day
The platforms have been demolished, but the stationhouse remains in private ownership. The crossing gates on both sides have also survived, as has the cattle dock which stands in the yard now used as an industrial vehicle depot. The former Up Home signal no.17 still stands in front of the foundations of the signal box.

It is planned to reopen the line as far as Holton-le-Clay.

References

Sources

External links
 Holton Le Clay station on navigable 1946 O. S. map

Disused railway stations in Lincolnshire
Railway stations in Great Britain closed in 1955
Railway stations in Great Britain opened in 1848
Former Great Northern Railway stations
John Grey Weightman railway stations
Matthew Ellison Hadfield railway stations